Tectella is a genus of fungi in the family Mycenaceae. The genus is widely distributed in northern temperate regions, and contains three species.

References

Mycenaceae
Agaricales genera